Shams-e Gaz (also Romanized as Shams Gaz; also known as Shamsi Gaz) is a village in Nehzatabad Rural District, in the Central District of Rudbar-e Jonubi County, Kerman Province, Iran. At the 2006 census, its population was 278, in 50 families.

References 

Populated places in Rudbar-e Jonubi County